Bezirk Murtal is a district of the state of Styria in Austria. It was formed on January 1, 2012, through a merger of the former Judenburg District and Knittelfeld District.

Municipalities
Since the 2015 Styria municipal structural reform, it consists of the following municipalities:

 Fohnsdorf
 Gaal
 Hohentauern
 Judenburg
 Knittelfeld
 Kobenz
 Lobmingtal
 Obdach
 Pöls-Oberkurzheim
 Pölstal
 Pusterwald
 Sankt Georgen ob Judenburg
 Sankt Marein-Feistritz
 St Margarethen
 Sankt Peter ob Judenburg
 Seckau
 Spielberg bei Knittelfeld
 Unzmarkt-Frauenburg
 Weißkirchen in Steiermark
 Zeltweg

References

 
Districts of Styria